The Cushing Sisters were three 20th-century American socialites. They were the daughters of neurosurgeon Harvey Williams Cushing and his wife Katharine Stone Crowell:
 Minnie Cushing (1906–1978), philanthropist and art collector.
 Betsey Cushing (1908–1998), philanthropist.
 Babe Cushing (1915–1978), fashion editor and style celebrity.

References

Sibling trios
American families